is a Japanese rugby union player. He plays as a fullback or wing.

He played for Suntory Sungoliath.

Kurihara had 27 caps for Japan, from 2000 to 2003, scoring 20 tries, 71 conversions and 35 penalties, 347 points on aggregate. He played four times at the 2003 Rugby World Cup, scoring 1 try, 4 conversions and 9 penalties, 40 points in aggregate. He has been absent from his National Team since then.

Kurihara made History when he scored 6 tries and 15 conversions, 60 points on aggregate, in the 120–3 win over Taiwan, on 21 July 2002, in a Rugby World Cup qualifier, setting a new world record for points in a match.

References

External links

1978 births
Living people
Japanese rugby union players
Rugby union fullbacks
Rugby union wings
Japan international rugby union players
Asian Games medalists in rugby union
Rugby union players at the 2002 Asian Games
Urayasu D-Rocks players
Tokyo Sungoliath players
Asian Games silver medalists for Japan
Medalists at the 2002 Asian Games
Japan international rugby sevens players